Summer is a surname, and it may refer to:

 Cree Summer (born 1969), Canadian-American actress
 Donna Summer (1948–2012), American singer and songwriter
 Edward Summer (1946–2014), American artist, filmmaker and writer
 India Summer (born 1975), American pornographic actress
 Mark Summer (born 1958), American jazz cellist

See also 
 Sommer, a surname
 Summer (given name)
 Summers (surname)
 Sumner (surname)